James Francis Whitty (September 11, 1931 - November 18, 2015), was an American politician who was a member of the Oregon House of Representatives.

He was born in North Bend, Oregon. He attended the University of Portland, where he earned a Bachelor of Arts degree.

His wife, Nikki Whitty, née Hungerford, (1945–2011) was county commissioner of Coos County, Oregon.

References

1931 births
2015 deaths
Democratic Party members of the Oregon House of Representatives
People from Coos Bay, Oregon
University of Portland alumni
County commissioners in Oregon
People from North Bend, Oregon
People from Coquille, Oregon